Dogmatic is a 1999 Canadian-American TV film that aired on May 30, 1999 on ABC as part of season 43 of the anthology series Wonderful World of Disney. It stars Michael Riley as an advertising executive who switches bodies with a dog. It was directed by Neill Fearnley.

Dogmatic was filmed in Canada in 1996.

External links

American comedy television films
Canadian comedy television films
English-language Canadian films
Films directed by Neill Fearnley
1999 television films
1999 films
Body swapping in films
1990s American films
1990s Canadian films